The 2015 Tirreno–Adriatico was the 50th edition of the Tirreno–Adriatico stage race. It took place from 11 to 17 March and was the third race of the 2015 UCI World Tour. The race was one of the most important races in the early part of the cycling season and was used by riders preparing both for the Grand Tours and for the classics season.

The route of the 2015 edition started and finished with individual time trials, one of which was rescheduled from a team time trial shortly before the race began. In between, the race consisted of two stages suitable for sprinters, one for puncheurs and two for climbers. The key stage of the race was stage 5, which involved a summit finish on Monte Terminillo. The defending champion from the 2014 edition was Alberto Contador, who was expected to be challenged by three of the strongest stage racers in the world, Nairo Quintana, Vincenzo Nibali and Chris Froome. Froome, however, pulled out shortly before the race.

The first individual time trial was won by Adriano Malori, who kept the lead for the first two stages. Greg Van Avermaet and Wout Poels won the next two stages, each taking the race lead for one day. The queen stage to Monte Terminillo was won by Quintana, who took the overall lead and was able to defend it to the end of the race. Bauke Mollema finished second, 18 seconds behind Quintana, with Rigoberto Urán third.

Peter Sagan won the points classification, after he won one stage and finished in the top ten on three others. The mountains classification was won by Carlos Quintero, while Quintana won the young rider classification as a consequence of his overall race victory.

Teams 
As Tirreno-Adriatico was a UCI World Tour event, all 17 UCI WorldTeams were invited automatically and were obliged to send a squad. Five Professional Continental teams received wildcard invitations.

Pre-race favourites 
The key stages on the general classification were expected to be the time trials and the summit finish. The race was originally expected to be the first contest of the season between the four riders expected to contest the Tour de France: the 2014 Tirreno–Adriatico champion Alberto Contador, the 2013 Tirreno–Adriatico champion Vincenzo Nibali, Nairo Quintana and Chris Froome. Shortly before the race, however, Froome withdrew on account of a chest infection (he had also withdrawn at the last minute in 2013). Following Froome's withdrawal, Contador was seen as the main favourite for the race; he had demonstrated his form when he and Froome fought a close battle in the Vuelta a Andalucía weeks earlier. Nibali, however, had not yet shown good form in the 2015 season, while Quintana had not raced for several weeks following a crash. Other riders considered to have a chance in the general classification included Rigoberto Urán, Joaquim Rodríguez, Dan Martin and Thibaut Pinot.

As well as losing Froome from the general classification battle, the race also lost one of the riders expected to challenge for stage wins. Marcel Kittel withdrew from the race with a virus. The principal sprinters left in the race were Mark Cavendish, Elia Viviani, Tyler Farrar and Sam Bennett. The race was also notable as the first time when Peter Sagan raced alongside Contador in the  team; Sagan was expected to feature both on the sprint stages and on the uphill finish on stage 3.

Route 

Tirreno–Adriatico was an important race in the early part of the road cycling season. It was the third UCI World Tour race of the year, running at the same time as Paris–Nice. The two races compete for prestige and for the best riders. Tirreno–Adriatico was an important test as part of riders' preparations both for the Grand Tours and for the classics races, such as Milan–San Remo. The race generally took the riders east across central Italy, from the Tyrrhenian Sea to the Adriatic Sea – the race is therefore sometimes known as the "race of the two seas" – and the Italian names of the seas give the name Tirreno–Adriatico.

The race was originally intended to begin with a  team time trial around Lido di Camaiore. This was expected to be a difficult test and to result in significant gaps in the general classification. Heavy wind and rain in the week before the race, however, forced the race organisers, RCS Sport, to change this stage. This was expected to result in smaller gaps; it was a particular blow to the  team, who had based most of their squad around the team time trial.

Stage 2 was a fairly flat stage, expected to suit the sprinters preparing for Milan–San Remo. Stage 3 was also unlikely to change the general classification, though it included a steep uphill finish. The key stages, however, came on the weekend. Stage 4 was a difficult, mountainous stage with a downhill finish. The following day's route had a summit finish on the  climb of Monte Terminillo. Stage 6 was another fairly flat stage and the race ended on the Adriatic coast with another individual time trial in San Benedetto del Tronto.

Stages

Stage 1 
11 March 2015 – Lido di Camaiore, individual time trial (ITT)

Stage 1 was originally intended to be a  team time trial, but bad weather (high wind and torrential rain) in the week leading up to the event made this impossible. The race organisers reduced the race to a  individual time trial; on the day of the race, this was shortened by a further . The course was based in the Lido di Camaiore holiday resort on the Tyrrhenian coast and was entirely flat. The out-and-back course meant that the riders had a tailwind on the first half of the course and a headwind on the second.

The early benchmark time was set by Daniel Oss, who completed the course in 6' 08". A good time was also set by Peter Sagan, whose time was 6' 10" and who was the best young rider in the stage. Sagan did well to set such a good time, since he hit a pavement early in his ride and nearly fell. Oss kept the lead for a long time, but was eventually overtaken by Matthias Brändle. Brändle, however, was immediately overtaken by Adriano Malori, the Italian national time trial champion – who won the closing time trial of the 2014 Tirreno–Adriatico – with a time of 6' 04". Maciej Bodnar, Steve Cummings and Greg Van Avermaet all came close to Malori's time, but were unable to beat it. The principal favourite for the stage, former world time trial champion Fabian Cancellara, finished one second behind Malori, who therefore won the stage, winning both the blue jersey of the overall leader of the race and the red jersey of the points classification leader.

Rigoberto Urán was the fastest of the general classification contenders, finishing 19th on the stage, 10" behind Malori. Vincenzo Nibali was the first of the three major favourites for the race, one second behind Urán. Alberto Contador and Nairo Quintana both lost time.

Stage 2 
12 March 2015 – Camaiore to Cascina, 

The second stage of the race was a  route from Camaiore, the location of stage 1, to Cascina. The course started with one and a half laps of a circuit around Camaiore, including the only two categorised climbs of the day, before heading south-east towards the city of Lucca. After leaving Lucca, the course turned west, then headed north to enter Cascina. In Cascina, the riders completed two laps of a  finishing circuit. Although the final circuit was flat, there were three roundabouts, a sharp turn and a bridge in the final .

An early breakaway was formed on the circuit around Camaiore. This was made up of seven riders: Edoardo Zardini, Danilo Wyss, Cristiano Salerno and Patrick Konrad, Camilo Castiblanco, Carlos Quintero (both ) and Martijn Keizer. The breakaway built up a lead of over six minutes and took all the mountains classification points. Wyss won the first ahead of Quintero; Quintero beat Wyss on the second climb. Wyss went on to take the jersey for the leader of the mountains classification thanks to his better general classification standing after the stage. The breakaway was carefully controlled by the sprinters' teams − principally  and  − and with  remaining the breakaway had less than three minutes' lead. The gap was reduced to less than 90 seconds as the peloton entered the finishing circuit with  remaining.

About  later, Zardini attacked and was followed by Quintero and Salerno. These three riders continued alone; they had less than a minute's lead as they entered the final lap of the circuit with  remaining and were caught soon afterwards. There was a crash in the peloton  from the finish, which eliminated Matteo Pelucchi from contention, as well as causing some delay for 's general classification rider Adam Yates.

Going into the final kilometres of the race, several teams were competing at the front of the peloton. ,  and  all tried to set up their sprinters, with Zdeněk Štybar particularly prominent.  led the group under the flamme rouge with  remaining, as Edvald Boasson Hagen attempted to lead out his teammate Tyler Farrar. In the final few hundred metres, however, there was a large crash. Mark Cavendish suddenly moved right, clashing wheels with Elia Viviani. Several other riders were brought down in the incident, including Sacha Modolo and Luka Mezgec. This crash left a small group of 12 riders to contest the stage finish. Jens Debusschere, riding in the colours of the Belgian national champion, outsprinted Peter Sagan on the line; Sam Bennett finished third. Thanks to the time bonus he won for coming second, Sagan moved up into second place overall, on the same time as Malori. Debusschere, meanwhile, moved into the lead of the points classification.

It was revealed after the stage that Cavendish's sudden movement had been caused by his chain falling off the big chainring. The loss of power caused him to swerve right and Viviani was unable to avoid him. Viviani suffered cuts and abrasions from the crash, though he avoided any broken bones and was able to complete the stage.  were keen to investigate the incident, as Tom Boonen had suffered a similar problem in the Tour of Qatar.

Stage 3 
13 March 2015 – Cascina to Arezzo, 

Stage 3 took the riders on a  route from Cascina to Arezzo. The route was very similar to stage 3 of the previous year's race, with a long route east, including two categorised climbs, and a finishing circuit in Arezzo. In the 2015 edition, the riders did five laps of a  circuit. The final  of the circuit was difficult: it was uphill, with one section of 11%, there was a narrow gate and one section of road was cobbled. On the previous year's stage, Peter Sagan had beaten Michał Kwiatkowski in the sprint.

The early breakaway was formed by Nicola Boem, Carlos Quintero, Chad Haga, Danilo Wyss and Rick Flens. Wyss, the leader of the mountains classification, won both mountain sprints, with Quintero behind him both times. With  left to race, the breakaway had a five-minute lead. Sagan's  team, however, controlled the race carefully: Matteo Tosatto and Christopher Juul-Jensen both put in long efforts on the front of the peloton to bring the group back. The lead was less than a minute with  left to race and the breakaway split.  from the end, Boem and Haga were the last riders of the group to be caught.

Sagan's teammates, however, were quickly running out and, with  remaining, he only had Maciej Bodnar left to support him. BMC, meanwhile, had several riders left to support Greg Van Avermaet. Van Avermaet was therefore perfectly positioned as the climb began and attacked towards the top. He won a small gap ahead of Zdeněk Štybar and was able to hold on to his lead to take the stage victory. Sagan was the quickest in the final metres, but he had started too far back; although he was able to pass Stybar to finish second on the stage, he was unable to catch Van Avermaet. Sagan did, however, take the lead in the points classification. Van Avermaet took over the lead in the general classification thanks to the bonus seconds he won on the stage.

Stage 4 
14 March 2015 – Indicatore (Arezzo) to Castelraimondo, 

The route took the riders from Arezzo east, with intermediate sprints in Gubbio and Fabriano and two classified climbs. The riders then entered a  finishing circuit around the town of Castelraimondo. The riders did two laps of the circuit, each of which included the climb of the Crispiero, a  climb with an average gradient of over 9%. Following the climb, there was a technical  descent into the stage finish. The two riders built up a lead of over seven minutes ahead of the main peloton, though it seemed that both riders had crashed at some point on the route, away from the view of the television cameras. Two separate chasing groups formed: one was made up of Nathan Haas and Carlos Quintero; the other was formed by Walter Pedraza, Miguel Ángel Rubiano (both ) and Manuel Quinziato. Neither of the chase groups was successful, however, and the lead pair stayed clear until Durbridge tired with  remaining. Hayman was caught soon afterwards.

On the first climb of the Crispiero, Giovanni Visconti attacked along with Michele Scarponi and Julián Arredondo. Visconti was the first to cross the summit, with Daniel Moreno catching the group on the descent. The riders were caught, however, on the flat section between the two climbs, with approximately  still to race. After the group was caught,  came forwards in support of Domenico Pozzovivo. Alexis Vuillermoz led the peloton into the foot of the final climb, dropping Van Avermaet, the race leader, with about  left. Giampaolo Caruso was the next to attack. As he was approaching the summit and looking at the group behind, Wout Poels attacked and came past on Caruso's left.

Poels therefore entered the descent off the Crispiero alone, with several seconds lead over the main group. The main favourites for the general classification hesitated before taking up the chase, allowing Poels to build a lead. Eventually, Katusha attempted to chase him down, but Poels was able to make the most of the difficult descent and built a 20-second lead. He also moved into the overall lead of the race, with a 17-second advantage over Rigoberto Urán, who had won the sprint for second place in the group behind.

Poels, who was leading Sky in the absence of Chris Froome, expressed hope after the stage that he would be able to defend his race lead on the summit finish the following day. In the other classifications, Thibaut Pinot moved into the lead of the young riders competition, as he moved up to fourth place in the general classification. Quintero, having been part of the breakaway for the third day running, took enough mountain points on the stage to move into the lead of the mountains classification.

Stage 5 
15 March 2015 – Esanatoglia to Monte Terminillo, 

Stage 5 was the queen stage of the 2015 Tirreno−Adriatico and the only summit finish of the race. It took the riders on a  course from Esanatoglia. The peloton first travelled south, crossing three significant climbs in the first . The middle of the stage was flat, as the riders travelled southwest towards Terni, but the final part of the stage was difficult. The route first passed through Rieti, then turned east towards the summit finish at a ski station on Monte Terminillo. The steepest sections were in the first part of the climb (one section had a gradient of 12%); the rest of the climb had a steady incline, except for the final few hundred metres of false flat. The stage took place in cold, difficult conditions with temperatures below . There were rumours before the stage that it would have to be cancelled, but these were refuted by the race organisers and the stage took place as planned.

The day's main breakaway was formed early on by Maxime Monfort, Michele Scarponi, Andriy Hrivko (both ), Alessandro De Marchi, Matteo Montaguti, Paul Voß, Ángel Vicioso and Jesús Herrada. They built up a lead of over seven minutes after  of racing. Montaguti won both mountain sprints early in the stage, with Scarponi second on both occasions. After the two climbs, the main peloton made an effort to reduce the breakaway's lead and the gap was reduced to two minutes at the base of the final climb of the day. The breakaway disintegrated on the final climb, with Scarponi, De Marchi and Monfort forming a lead group. In the peloton, Vasil Kiryienka and Ivan Basso were setting the pace. Scarponi pulled clear of De Marchi and Monfort to lead the race solo, as Roman Kreuziger and Alberto Contador briefly pulled clear of the main pack. As the riders entered the final , snow began to fall. As Contador drifted back in the pack, Nairo Quintana attacked and immediately broke clear of the pack. Contador tried to respond but was unable to take Quintana's wheel. Contador ended up in a group of about 15 riders chasing Quintana. Vincenzo Nibali was dropped at this point, while Quintana quickly caught up to Scarponi.

Contador twice made attacks on the chasing group, but on both occasions was unable to break free, although the race leader, Wout Poels was dropped, while Rigoberto Urán also made an unsuccessful attack. Finally, Bauke Mollema put in a successful attack and dropped the group behind. Contador did most of the work in a group of five riders, including Urán, Joaquim Rodríguez, Thibaut Pinot and Adam Yates. The group did not keep up a steady pace, however, and Quintana was able to reach the finish line with a lead of 41 seconds over Mollema and 55 seconds over Contador's group. Quintana therefore moved into the lead of the overall classification, 39 seconds ahead of Mollema and over a minute ahead of Contador. Poels, meanwhile, finished 16th on the stage, 1' 37" behind Quintana, and dropped to tenth in the general classification.

After the stage, several riders expressed displeasure with the extreme weather conditions. Fabian Cancellara was prominent among them, as he had been in a dispute over hot weather at the Tour of Oman, with Filippo Pozzato and Luca Paolini expressing similar concerns. The conditions were particularly difficult for the riders in the gruppetto, as the conditions they faced in the final kilometres were significantly worse than those faced by the race leaders. Cancellara and other riders called for an extreme-weather policy to govern racing in such conditions.

Stage 6 
16 March 2015 – Rieti to Porto Sant'Elpidio, 

The sixth stage was the final road stage of the race. It took the riders from the city of Rieti, at the foot of Monte Terminillo, northeast to finish on the Adriatic coast at Porto Sant'Elpidio over a  route. The first part was a  route, which took the riders from the startline and across some medium mountains. The most difficult climb was at Montelparo and came  from the finish line. Once the riders had reached Porto Sant'Elpidio, they entered a  finishing circuit. They first rode the final  of the circuit and crossed the finish line; this was the final intermediate sprint of the day. They then completed two complete laps of the circuit, where the final  were entirely straight. The stage took place in rainy conditions.

They were caught, however, on the climb at Montelparo, as  increased the pace in the peloton. Their team leader, Alberto Contador, was one of the riders to set the pace on behalf of Peter Sagan. On this climb, several of the race's main sprinters were unable to stay with the peloton. These included Mark Cavendish and Luka Mezgec. The breakaway's advantage had been reduced to 1' 30" and, soon after the summit of the climb, Devolder sat up and was caught. Arashiro and Vanotti were caught soon after, with  still to race.

He was joined in the lead by Alexis Vuillermoz. Cavendish, along with his entire sprint train, pulled out of the race as they crossed the finish line for the first time in order to rest ahead of Milan–San Remo the following weekend.

He therefore positioned himself behind the final  rider, Gerald Ciolek, who was being led out by Edvald Boasson Hagen. Sagan passed Ciolek in the final  win the stage. Ciolek finished second, with Jens Debusschere in third. This was Sagan's first win in nine months, when he won a stage of the 2014 Tour de Suisse. All the general classification riders finished in the main group, so the standings were unchanged.

Stage 7 
17 March 2015 – San Benedetto del Tronto to San Benedetto del Tronto, individual time trial (ITT)

The seventh and final stage of the 2015 Tirreno–Adriatico was another individual time trial. The course was an out-and-back route; it first headed south, through an intermediate time check after , to a pair of 90-degree right hand turns halfway through the course. The course then headed north on almost entirely straight roads. The stage was flat throughout with no significant climbs.

The early lead was taken by Maciej Bodnar, who set a time of 11' 39". His time was soon beaten, however, by Adriano Malori, the winner of stage 1 and the Italian national time trial champion, with a time of 11' 27". Although Vasil Kiryienka came close, he was five seconds behind at the finish. Fabian Cancellara, who had come second to Malori on stage 1, set off as Malori was finishing. Cancellara was a second off Malori's time at the intermediate checkpoint, but he was five seconds quicker over the second part of the course and took the stage lead by four seconds. Cancellara's time would not be beaten by any of the remaining riders and he won the stage, with Malori in second and Kiryienka in third.

Though the general classification riders did not have a chance of victory on the stage, there were still positions to be won and lost. The best time from the general classification riders was that of Alberto Contador, 31 seconds behind Cancellara, and he stayed in fifth place overall. Wout Poels, Steve Cummings and Thibaut Pinot all put in good times, with Poels and Cummings moving up in the top ten and Pinot defending his fourth place ahead of Contador. Bauke Mollema also put in a strong ride, finishing ahead of Rigoberto Urán, who was seen as the better time triallist of the two. Mollema therefore defended his second place overall. He was not, however, able to catch the race leader Nairo Quintana. Quintana finished 55" behind Cancellara in 55th place; he took the overall race victory ahead of Mollema by 18". Peter Sagan, the leader of the points competition, only had to finish the stage within the time limit to win the classification. He came very close to failing: he was the slowest rider in the stage, finishing 2' 59" behind Cancellara. It was, however, just enough to prevent his exclusion and to allow him the classification victory.

Classification leadership table 
There were four main classifications in the 2015 Tirreno–Adriatico. The first and most important of these was the general classification. This was calculated by adding each cyclist's finishing times on each stage. Time bonuses were awarded to the first three finishers on road stages (stages 2–6): the stage winner won a ten-second bonus, with six and four seconds for the second and third riders respectively. Bonus seconds were also awarded to the first three riders at intermediate sprints (three seconds for the winner of the sprint, two seconds for the rider in second and one second for the rider in third. The leader of the general classification received a blue jersey and the winner of the classification was considered the overall winner of the race.

The second classification was the points classification. On each stage of the race, points were awarded to the top 10 riders. The winner won 12 points, with 10 for the second-placed rider, 8 for the third-placed rider and then one point fewer for each place down to tenth place. Points were also awarded to the top four riders at intermediate sprints, with five points for the winner of the sprint and three, two and one points for the riders in second, third and fourth places respectively. It was originally intended that points would not be awarded on stage 1 as it was a team time trial. After this was changed to an individual time trial, however, points were awarded on the stage, on the same scale as for an intermediate sprint. The winner of the points classification was awarded a red jersey.

The third classification was the mountains classification. On each of the road stages there were classified climbs on the route. The first riders to the top of the climb were awarded points in the mountains classification. For most of the climbs, the first four riders won points, with five, three, two and one points respectively. More points were awarded for the two most difficult climbs of the race. These were the summit finish to Monte Terminillo on stage 5 and the Poggio San Romualdo on stage 4. On these climbs, the winner won 15 points in the classification, with the next six riders also winning points. The rider with the most points was awarded the green jersey.

The final classification was the young riders classification. This was based on the general classification: the highest placed rider born after 1 January 1990 was the leader of the classification and was awarded a white jersey.

Classification standings

General classification

Points classification

Mountains classification

Young rider classification

Team classification

References

Sources

External links 

Tirreno–Adriatico
Tirreno-Adriatico
Tirreno-Adriatico